Rosaria Salerno is the former City Clerk of Boston and a former member of the Boston City Council.

Salerno was first elected to the City Council in November 1987, and served as an at-large member from 1988 to 1993. She was a candidate for Mayor of Boston in 1993, finishing in fourth place with 17.54% of the vote.

On January 26, 1995, Salerno was named City Clerk by the City Council, succeeding the retiring Patrick F. McDonough. She retired in 2011.

References

Boston city clerks
Boston City Council members
Year of birth missing (living people)
Living people
Women city councillors in Massachusetts
21st-century American women